Lepidochrysops labwor is a butterfly in the family Lycaenidae. It is found in Uganda (from Karamoja to the Labwor Range). The habitat consists of areas with short grass and flowers of the family Lamiaceae, amongst rock slabs and boulders.

References

Butterflies described in 1957
Lepidochrysops
Endemic fauna of Uganda
Butterflies of Africa